The Central Weather Bureau seismic intensity scale is a seismic intensity scale used in Taiwan. It was established by the Central Weather Bureau.

Scale overview

References 

Seismic intensity scales
Central Weather Bureau